The Coleraine by-election of 31 January 1862 was called on the death of the previous M.P. John Boyd in January 1862. The only candidate was Sir Henry Hervey Bruce, 3rd Baronet. He retained the seat until the 1874 United Kingdom general election when he was defeated by the Liberal Daniel Taylor.

References

By-elections to the Parliament of the United Kingdom in County Londonderry constituencies
Coleraine
1862 elections in the United Kingdom
1862 elections in Ireland